The 1995 CFL season was the 38th season of the Canadian Football League, and the 42nd in modern-day Canadian football.

CFL news in 1995

Expansion, relocation, folding and realignment
Two more United States-based teams were admitted, the Birmingham Barracudas and the Memphis Mad Dogs. In the off-season the Sacramento Gold Miners moved to San Antonio to become the San Antonio Texans. The Texans would play their home games at the Alamodome, which is the only American stadium designed and built to accommodate a regulation Canadian football field. The Baltimore Football Club the only team in the Northeast US finally found themselves a new nickname and christened themselves the Stallions at the beginning of the second week of the season. In April 1995, the Las Vegas Posse, after a disastrous 1994 season, were slated to move to Jackson, Mississippi and were included in draft schedules for the league that year; squabbles with the Posse's board of directors and an inability for potential new owners to come up with the funds to cover the team's operations prompted the CFL to suspend the team and disperse its roster instead.

With the admittance of the Barracudas and Mad Dogs, and in hopes of securing a television contract, the CFL undertook a realignment.  The longstanding alignment of East and West was discontinued.  All five U.S.-based teams would play in the South Division, while all eight Canadian teams would compete in the North Division. Five teams from the North and three from the South would qualify for the playoffs. To make up for the disparity, the lowest-seeded North Division playoff team played in the South Division playoffs against the top South Division team. This was a precursor to the CFL's current crossover playoff rule that would be instituted in 1997 although unlike the current rule, in 1995 the fifth place North Division team automatically "crossed over" regardless of how its record compared to those of the South Division teams. This meant that Winnipeg, which finished in fifth place in the North at 7–11, made the playoffs instead while Memphis, which finished fourth place in the South Division with a record of 9–9, was nevertheless denied a place in the postseason.

Uniform changes
The Toronto Argonauts revealed an all-new logo and colour scheme. Their new colours were dark blue, slate green and metallic silver. The new logo design was based on the "Jason and the Argonauts" premise featuring a side profile of a helmeted warrior facing one side and holding up a round shield with an "A" on it.

The Birmingham Barracudas released the design of their logo and uniforms prior to the season. Their team colours were black, blue, teal and burnt orange.

The Memphis Mad Dogs unveiled their new team colours as forest green, burgundy, black and gold.

All three teams got new jerseys with an unusual template. The jerseys had the team's primary logo printed super large on the lower part of one side of the jersey while player numbers', which were much smaller in size, on the opposite side of the player's upper torso. Similar jerseys were being used by teams of the World League of American Football.

As the Sacramento Gold Miners became the San Antonio Texans, they changed their logo from a pick axe striking gold to a logo of a head of a cowboy with a black hat and a red bandana scarf imposed on a large star. They also added burgundy to teal, old gold and black as their team colours.

The Ottawa Rough Riders reverted their team colour of light navy to black. They kept the colours metallic gold and red. The logo that was unveiled last season was retained with black substituting over from light navy. Also after the 1995 season, in time for the 1996 (and what would be their last season) the Rough Riders also returned to using a black helmet from a metallic gold one and back to black jerseys as they had worn from at least 1976 to 1993 inclusive instead of the red ones they wore in 1994 and 1995.

Game ball supplier
The Wilson company, which has supplied the NFL with their game balls since 1941, began supplying the game balls to the CFL this season, and has done so since then. Prior to this, the league used the  Spalding J5V ball as their game ball.

The Grey Cup
The city of Regina played host to the Grey Cup game for the first time. In the game, viewers at home and at Taylor Field witnessed the Baltimore Stallions defeat the Calgary Stampeders, 37–20, becoming the first (and only) American team to win the Grey Cup.

Regular season standings

Final regular season standings
Note: GP = Games Played, W = Wins, L = Losses, T = Ties, PF = Points For, PA = Points Against, Pts = Points. Teams in bold qualified for the playoffs.

Grey Cup playoffs

The Baltimore Stallions were the 1995 Grey Cup champions, defeating the Calgary Stampeders 37–20 at Regina's Taylor Field.  The Stallions became the only American team to win the Grey Cup. The Stallions' Tracy Ham (QB) was named the Grey Cup's Most Valuable Player and the Stampeders' Dave Sapunjis (SB) was the Grey Cup's Most Valuable Canadian.

Playoff bracket

CFL Leaders
 CFL Passing Leaders
 CFL Rushing Leaders
 CFL Receiving Leaders

1995 CFL All-Stars

Offence
QB – Matt Dunigan, Birmingham Barracudas
FB – Mike Saunders, San Antonio Texans
RB – Mike Pringle, Baltimore Stallions
SB – Dave Sapunjis, Calgary Stampeders
SB – Allen Pitts, Calgary Stampeders
WR – Don Narcisse, Saskatchewan Roughriders
WR – Earl Winfield, Hamilton Tiger-Cats
C – Mike Kiselak, San Antonio Texans
OG – Jamie Taras, BC Lions
OG – Mike Withycombe, Baltimore Stallions
OT – Rocco Romano, Calgary Stampeders
OT – Neal Fort, Baltimore Stallions

Defence
DT – Bennie Goods, Edmonton Eskimos
DT – Jearld Baylis, Baltimore Stallions
DE – Tim Cofield, Memphis Mad Dogs
DE – Will Johnson, Calgary Stampeders
LB – Alondra Johnson, Calgary Stampeders
LB – O. J. Brigance, Baltimore Stallions
LB – Willie Pless, Edmonton Eskimos
CB – Eric Carter, Hamilton Tiger-Cats
CB – Irvin Smith, Baltimore Stallions
DB – Glenn Rogers Jr., Edmonton Eskimos
DB – Charles Anthony, Baltimore Stallions
DS – Anthony Drawhorn, Birmingham Barracudas

Special teams
P – Josh Miller, Baltimore Stallions
K – Roman Anderson, San Antonio Texans
ST – Chris Wright, Baltimore Stallions

1995 Southern All-Stars

Offence
QB – Matt Dunigan, Birmingham Barracudas
FB – Mike Saunders, San Antonio Texans
RB – Mike Pringle, Baltimore Stallions
SB – Jason Phillips, Birmingham Barracudas
SB – Chris Armstrong, Baltimore Stallions
WR – Joe Horn, Memphis Mad Dogs
WR – Marcus Grant, Birmingham Barracudas
C – Mike Kiselak, San Antonio Texans
OG – Fred Childress, Birmingham Barracudas
OG – Mike Withycombe, Baltimore Stallions
OT – Shar Pourdanesh, Baltimore Stallions
OT – Neal Fort, Baltimore Stallions

Defence
DT – Rodney Harding, Memphis Mad Dogs
DT – Jearld Baylis, Baltimore Stallions
DE – Tim Cofield, Memphis Mad Dogs
DE – Elfrid Payton, Baltimore Stallions
LB – Tracy Gravely, Baltimore Stallions
LB – O. J. Brigance, Baltimore Stallions
LB – David Harper, San Antonio Texans
CB – Donald Smith, Memphis Mad Dogs
CB – Irvin Smith, Baltimore Stallions
DB – Andre Strode, Birmingham Barracudas
DB – Charles Anthony, Baltimore Stallions
DS – Anthony Drawhorn, Birmingham Barracudas

Special teams
P – Josh Miller, Baltimore Stallions
K – Roman Anderson, San Antonio Texans
ST – Chris Wright, Baltimore Stallions

1995 Northern All-Stars

Offence
QB – Jeff Garcia, Calgary Stampeders
FB – Michael Soles, Edmonton Eskimos
RB – Cory Philpot, BC Lions
SB – Dave Sapunjis, Calgary Stampeders
SB – Allen Pitts, Calgary Stampeders
WR – Don Narcisse, Saskatchewan Roughriders
WR – Earl Winfield, Hamilton Tiger-Cats
C – Rod Connop, Edmonton Eskimos
OG – Jamie Taras, BC Lions
OG – Pierre Vercheval, Toronto Argonauts
OT – Rocco Romano, Calgary Stampeders
OT – Vic Stevenson, BC Lions

Defence
DT – Bennie Goods, Edmonton Eskimos
DT – John Kropke, Ottawa Rough Riders
DE – Andrew Stewart, BC Lions
DE – Will Johnson, Calgary Stampeders
LB – Alondra Johnson, Calgary Stampeders
LB – Mike O'Shea, Hamilton Tiger-Cats
LB – Willie Pless, Edmonton Eskimos
CB – Eric Carter, Hamilton Tiger-Cats
CB – Marvin Coleman, Calgary Stampeders
DB – Glenn Rogers Jr., Edmonton Eskimos
DB – Brett Young, Ottawa Rough Riders
DS – Tom Europe, BC Lions

Special teams
P – Bob Cameron, Winnipeg Blue Bombers
K – Mark McLoughlin, Calgary Stampeders
ST – Sam Rogers, Hamilton Tiger-Cats

1995 CFL Awards
CFL's Most Outstanding Player Award – Mike Pringle (RB), Baltimore Stallions
CFL's Most Outstanding Canadian Award – Dave Sapunjis (SB), Calgary Stampeders
CFL's Most Outstanding Defensive Player Award – Willie Pless (LB), Edmonton Eskimos
CFL's Most Outstanding Offensive Lineman Award – Mike Withycombe (OG), Baltimore Stallions
CFL's Most Outstanding Rookie Award – Shalon Baker (WR), Edmonton Eskimos
CFLPA's Outstanding Community Service Award – Mark McLoughlin (K), Calgary Stampeders
CFL's Coach of the Year – Don Matthews, Baltimore Stallions
Commissioner's Award - Don Wittman, CBC broadcaster

References 

CFL
Canadian Football League seasons